The following are a list of notable mines and quarries within 50 miles of Bancroft, Ontario.

See also 

 List of mines in Ontario

 Uranium mining in the Bancroft area
 Bancroft Rockhound Gemboree

Lists of mines in Canada